Edgware Road is a London Underground station on the Circle, District and Hammersmith & City lines, located on the corner of Chapel Street and Cabbell Street, within Travelcard zone 1. A separate station of the same name but served by the Bakerloo line is located about 150 metres away on the opposite side of Marylebone Road.

There have been proposals in the past to rename one of the Edgware Road stations to avoid confusion. Neither of them should be confused with the Edgware station on the Northern line.

History

It was the site of one of the 7 July 2005 London bombings. Mohammad Sidique Khan detonated a bomb at about 8:50am, on board a westbound Circle line train as it was leaving the station, killing six passengers.

Station layout
The station lies in a cutting open to the elements, not in a tunnel.

To the east of the station, the Circle and Hammersmith & City lines share the same tracks towards .

Since December 2009, Circle line trains call at the station twice on each journey: initially as a through service from Hammersmith towards , then as the terminus for that same service completing the loop via  (or the same journey in reverse). There are no longer through trains here between the northern part of the Circle line and its western part.

The usual service pattern is: platform 1 for outer rail services to Kings Cross, Liverpool Street and beyond, platform 2 for District line trains to Earl's Court and Wimbledon, platform 3 for Circle line to High Street Kensington and Victoria, and platform 4 (inner rail) for Shepherd's Bush Market and Hammersmith. This may vary in times of disruption – trains can go east from platforms 1, 2 and 3 and to any of the westbound destinations from platforms 2, 3 or 4.

Services

Circle line
Prior to 13 December 2009, the Circle line trains travelled in both directions around a simple loop with 27 stations and 12.89 miles (20.75 km) of track. In December 2009 the Circle line was extended to include the Hammersmith & City route from Edgware Road to Hammersmith. Rather than continuously running around the circle, trains now travel from Hammersmith to Edgware Road, generally going around the circle once before terminating at Edgware Road, and returning via the same route; occasional trains may also continue clockwise through Edgware Road to additional stations. Service operation was changed to improve reliability and increase the service frequency on the Hammersmith branch.

The service pattern all day is:
6tph via High Street Kensington (Anti-clockwise)
6tph via Kings Cross St Pancras (Clockwise)
6tph to Hammersmith (Anti-clockwise)

District line
Edgware Road is the terminus for all District line services via High Street Kensington. Trains usually terminate at platform 2 which can also be used as a through platform although this feature is rarely used.

The service pattern all day is:
6tph Wimbledon (Westbound)

Hammersmith & City line

The service pattern all day is:
6tph to Barking (Eastbound)
6tph to Hammersmith (Westbound)

Artwork 
As part of the introduction of the S7 and S8 Stock trains to the District, Circle, Hammersmith & City and Metropolitan lines in the early 2010s, power upgrades required the construction of a large electrical substation adjacent to the station. The artwork - Wrapper - was unveiled in November 2012, a mosaic of 700 decorated panels of various patterns inspired by local history.

Connections
London Buses routes 18, 27 and 205 and night routes N18 and N205 serve the station.

See also

7 July 2005 London bombings

References

Circle line (London Underground) stations
District line stations
Hammersmith & City line stations
Tube stations in the City of Westminster
Former Metropolitan Railway stations
Railway stations in Great Britain opened in 1863